Burning Flowers is a 1985 Norwegian drama film directed by Eva Dahr and Eva Isaksen, based on a story by Lars Saabye Christensen, and starring Torstein Hølmebakk and Lise Fjeldstad. The film is about the teenager Hermann (Hølmebakk) who develops a relationship with the middle-aged Rosa (Fjeldstad).

External links
 
 

1985 films
1985 drama films
Norwegian drama films
1980s Norwegian-language films